Naruemol Chaiwai (Thai: นฤมล ใจไว, born 2 July 1990) is a Thai cricketer. In April 2021, the Cricket Association of Thailand appointed her as the captain of the Thailand women's team, replacing Sornnarin Tippoch.

Biography
Chaiwai played for the national cricket team in the 2017 Women's Cricket World Cup Qualifier in February 2017. She was the leading run-scorer for Thailand in the 2018 Women's Twenty20 Asia Cup, with 90 runs in five matches.

In June 2018, she was named in Thailand's squad for the 2018 ICC Women's World Twenty20 Qualifier tournament. She made her Women's Twenty20 International (WT20I) debut for Thailand on 3 June 2018, in the 2018 Women's Twenty20 Asia Cup. In February 2019, she was the leading run-scorer in the 2019 ICC Women's Qualifier Asia tournament, with 181 runs in six matches.

In August 2019, she was named in Thailand's squad for the 2019 ICC Women's World Twenty20 Qualifier tournament in Scotland. She was the leading run-scorer for Thailand in the tournament, with 87 runs in five matches. In October 2019, she was named in the Women's Global Development Squad, ahead of a five-match series in Australia. In January 2020, she was named in Thailand's squad for the 2020 ICC Women's T20 World Cup in Australia.

In November 2021, she was named as the captain of Thailand's team for the 2021 Women's Cricket World Cup Qualifier tournament in Zimbabwe. She played in Thailand's first match of the tournament, on 21 November 2021 against Zimbabwe.

In October 2022, she played for Thailand in Women's Twenty20 Asia Cup.

References

Further reading

External links

 

1990 births
Living people
Naruemol Chaiwai
Naruemol Chaiwai
Naruemol Chaiwai
Naruemol Chaiwai
Cricketers at the 2010 Asian Games
Cricketers at the 2014 Asian Games
Naruemol Chaiwai
Southeast Asian Games medalists in cricket
Competitors at the 2017 Southeast Asian Games
Naruemol Chaiwai
Women cricket captains
Naruemol Chaiwai